Ig epsilon chain C region is a protein that in humans is encoded by the IGHE gene.

References

Further reading 

 
 
 
 
 
 
 
 
 
 
 
 
 
 
 
 
 

Proteins